Vivian Springford (February 1, 1913 – January 14, 2003) was an American painter and assemblage artist active in the second half of the 20th century. Springford's abstract paintings and collages are best known for their focus on using color to express captivating patterns and phenomena found in nature as well as from Chinese Calligraphy and Eastern forms of thought such as Taoism and Confucianism.

Early life and education 
Springford was born in 1913 in Milwaukee. Her family moved to Detroit in 1926, and in 1930 to New York, when Springford's father, Herbert Henry Springford, became President of Servel, Inc., a refrigerator manufacturer. She attended the Spence School with her sister, Margaret, and graduated in 1932. Shortly after in November 1932, Springford was featured as one of "Debutantes of the Winter Season in New York" in The New York Times. She continued her studies at the Arts Student League until 1946, primarily working under Jon Corbino (1905–1964) and Robert Brackman. Under their influence, Springford began her artistic career as a commercial illustrator in the 1930s to 40s, creating portraits of actresses, debutantes, and other society women for the local New York newspapers.

Artistic development

Early Commercial Work 

Throughout the 1930s and 1940s, Springford worked as a commercial illustrator and portrait artist. Her commissions included portraits of actresses and socialites for local New York newspapers and the book 1939 Juggernaut: The Path Towards Dictatorship by Albert Carr, for which Springford created illustrated images of twenty global dictators. Her commercial portraiture throughout this time was stylized though highly realistic.

Calligraphy Works: 1957-1962 
Throughout the 1950s, Springford's style began to grow more towards abstraction. She said the incorporation of abstraction once her work was (re)discovered was a gradual process, underway for some time before her initial, very assured execution of large canvases.

Vivian's first entirely abstract works were in a series of five canvases based on the Hindu folk tale, The Brahmin and Mongoose, done in 1957. In the story, a woman gives birth to a human boy and a mongoose and cares for both until the day she finds the animal with blood dripping from its jaws. Believing it has harmed her human child, she kills it, only to find that the mongoose had instead killed a cobra that was threatening its human brother

By the late 50's, Abstract Expressionism had become New York's dominant style of the time. and while Springford's work is often associated with other Abstract Expressionists—namely Willem de Kooning, Franz Kline, Jackson Pollock, and Helen Frankenthaler. Springford maintained her early influence stemmed from East Asian schools of art and culture, including Taoism and Confucianism. Chinese Calligraphy also heavily influenced the visual language of these gestural abstractions. The press release of Springford's first solo exhibition, a 1960 show at Great Jones Gallery, included the following text:About four years ago she was attracted to the rhythm and beauty in Chinese calligraphy. “Calligraphy” simply means handwriting, and Miss Springford wanted her painting to be as personal as her handwriting. “I liked the direct approach of the early Chinese painters,” she said. “Whatever they put down on paper stayed there; they didn’t edit. They didn’t copy nature, either; they interpreted it. Some of the older Chinese drawings are much more abstract than anything done today. I adapted their rhythm and free motion to my own abstract paintings.”

Rice Paper Mountings 1962-1966 
In 1962, Springford's work shifted to include swaths of bright colors opposing her writhing blacks. Mainly executed on white rice paper, a delicate calligraphic medium that requires thoughtful, rapid execution, her sophisticated integration of vivid colors certainly reflects close study dating back to her Art Students League days. But where her early color work tended towards soft and warm pastel tones, the new compositions, executed on the bright white rice paper, had a scouring effect. The early rice paper mountings conjure a world of landscapes and things in motion and introduce pictorial references and symbology into Springford's work. During this period, Springford began diluting her paint to various degrees, which—along with her new heightened exploration of color—would eventually become critical aspects of the techniques of her later works.

Chromatic Pools 1965-1986 
In the late 1960s, Springford forged a new artistic direction that involved pouring brightly hued acrylic paint of various densities onto canvas and paper. These centrifugal acrylic wash compositions eliminated lines and resulted in Springford's third significant body of works, the Chromatic Pools. The Chromatic Pools drew from complex patterns and geological phenomena found in nature, many of which she encountered throughout her travels to Asia, Africa, Europe, the Caribbean, and South America.

Springford's initial exploration of this new painting technique came after a 1965 trip to Yellowstone National Park, in which the artist discovered the park's chromatic pools. Beginning with paintings and rice paper mountings titled Morning Glory—named after one of Yellowstone's thermal springs—Springford started to create abstract compositions that explored the complex color patterns found in the park's pools and geysers.

Over the next twenty years, until her eyesight failed, Springford continued to produce distinct bodies of work that evolved from her Chromatic Pools series, including the Morning Glory Series, Cloud Crying Series, Cosmos Series, Martinique Series, and Poppy Series.

Assemblages: 1978-1984 
Beginning in 1978, Springford spent the five or six years remaining in her working life on her last great body of work, what she termed the Assemblages. The first Assemblage series titled “Star Stuff I&II” directly referenced the quote by astronomer Carl Sagan.

“We are made of star stuff. We are a way for the universe to know itself.“  - Carl Sagan

As this series progressed, Springford continued to evolve, exploring motifs of highly stylized aquatic and celestial compositions. With forms that come in and out of abstraction, gestural brushstrokes, a bright color palette, and paint in various states of dilution, works from this series represent the culmination of Springford's lifelong development and techniques as an artist.

Sculpture: 1985-1986 
From 1985 to 1986, the final years that Springford was able to work before her eyesight failed, she made a series of small sculptures from an array of materials, most notably bone. Springford would assemble these sculptures, photograph them, then dismantle them.

Exhibitions 
Springford has been represented in several solo and group exhibitions at institutions. Notable exhibitions were held at the National Academy of Design, New York, NY (1959); Great Jones Gallery, New York, NY (1960); Balin Traube Gallery, New York, NY (1962); Preston Gallery, New York, NY (1963); Brooklyn Museum, Brooklyn, NY (1975); WIA Foundation, New York, NY (1976); Visual Arts Coalition, New York, NY (1979); Gary Snyder Fine Arts, New York, NY (1998, 2001, 2003, 2009); Peyton Wright Gallery, Santa Fe, NM (2014, 2015); Tayloe Piggott Gallery, Jackson, WY (2017); Museum of Fine Arts, Boston, MA (2019); Almine Rech, New York, NY (2018, 2020), and Taka Ishii Gallery, Tokyo (2021) among others.

Springford debuted with a solo exhibition at Great Jones Gallery (September 26 – October 16, 1960). James R. Mellow, in an Arts Magazine review in 1960, remarked that Springford's calligraphic abstract works are “notable for a first one-man showing.” Springford's successful first exhibition was also featured in William Kronick's film, A Bowl of Cherries (1961), which was played at the Museum of Modern Art on a number of occasions. Its first showcase was on October 7, 1962, as the museum's "recent acquisition",  and then on August 10, 1966, as part of the museum's film program, "The Thirties: U.S.A."

Springford had a period of inactivity in the 1980s until the late 1990s due to declining health. In 1998, eighteen years after her last exhibition, art dealer Gary Snyder organized the first retrospective exhibition of Springford, titled Vivian Springford: Abstract Paintings 1956-1988. The show generated great attention from the public and collectors alike, and was nearly sold out before the opening.

In 2003, the year of Springford's death, her early works from the 1960s were again featured in a solo exhibition at Gary Snyder Fine Arts, West Meets East: A Memorial Exhibition of Painting on Canvas and Rice Paper by Vivian Springford (September 12 — October 25, 2003). Reviewing the exhibition for The New York Times, Grace Glueck praised the "strong sense of color" and "exuberant linear scribblings and doodlings".

Springford was a leading member of the Women in the Arts Foundation (WIA), through which she has had several exhibitions, including Works on Paper: Women Artists at the Brooklyn Museum in 1975 and a solo exhibition at WIA Foundation, New York, NY in 1976. Other museum exhibitions that included Springford's works are Denver Art Museum's Women of Abstract Expressionism (June 12, 2016 – September 25, 2016) and Museum of Fine Arts, Boston's Contemporary Art: Five Propositions (October 26, 2019 – May 4, 2020).

In 2018, Roberta Smith, The New York Times co-chief art critic, selected exhibitions in New York that she believed provided "a new visibility" to painting's present and recent past. One of the seven selections was the solo exhibition of Vivian Springford at Almine Rech, New York, NY (September 12 - October 20, 2018): "Most of the paintings here feature concentric poolings of translucent colors that intimate flowers, clouds and water reflections. They build on the potential of Georgia O'Keeffe's early watercolors — as O'Keeffe did not — but also evoke the art critic Robert Hughes's epithet about the Color Field paintings being "giant watercolors".

The exhibition at Almine Rech was also selected as one of the five "Season Openers" by Whitewall Magazine along with "New Work: Etel Adnan" at SFMOMA and "Sarah Lucas: Au Naturel" at the New Museum.

In June 2021, Springford's had her first solo exhibition in Asia at Taka Ishii Gallery in Tokyo. Exhibited were works from Springford's Star Stuff and Expansionist series which have not been exhibited publicly since 1979.

Publications 

 Marter, Joan, et al. Women of abstract expressionism. Denver, CO; New Haven, CT: Denver Art Museum in association with Yale University Press, 2016. 
 Schwartz, Alexandra and Shechet, Arlene. Vivian Springford. Brussels, Belgium: Almine Rech Gallery Editions, 2018. 
 Peyton Wright Gallery. Vivian Springford. Issuu, 30 July 2014, https://issuu.com/peytonwrightgallery/docs/vs_catalogue. Accessed 7 Sept. 2020.
 Review. New York, NY: The Village Voice, 1963.
 Review. New York, NY: The Villager (Greenwich Village, NY), 1960.
 Review. New York, NY: Arts Magazine, 1960.

References

Further reading 
 Gioia, Joe. “Finding Vivian Springford.” Vivian Springford Archive, 2021, https://vivianspringford.com/about-bio
 Rockefeller, Hall. “When it is the cosmos you are dealing with, what is art history?” Vivian Springford Archive, 2021, https://vivianspringford.com/cosmos-essay
 Rhodes, David. “Vivian Springford.” Brooklyn Rail, 9 Oct. 2018, https://brooklynrail.org/2018/10/artseen/Vivian-Springford. Accessed 7 Sept. 2020.
 Schwartz, Alexandra and Shechet, Arlene. Vivian Springford. Brussels, Belgium: Almine Rech Gallery Editions, 2018. 
 Gould, Rachel. “Forgotten Artist Vivian Springford’s Paintings Stun in New York.” Culture Trip, 21 Sept. 2018, https://theculturetrip.com/north-america/usa/new-york/new-york-city/articles/forgotten-artist-vivian-springfords-paintings-stun-in-new-york/. Accessed 7 Sept. 2020.
 Marter, Joan, et al. Women of abstract expressionism. Denver, CO; New Haven, CT: Denver Art Museum in association with Yale University Press, 2016. 
 Glueck, Grace. “ART IN REVIEW; Vivian Springford -- ‘West Meets East.’” The New York Times, 10 Oct. 2003, https://www.nytimes.com/2003/10/10/arts/art-in-review-vivian-springford-west-meets-east.html. Accessed 7 Sept, 2020.

External links

 Vivian Springford Archive

Abstract expressionist artists
Abstract painters
1913 births
2003 deaths
American debutantes
American women painters
Artists from New York (state)
20th-century American painters
20th-century American women artists
21st-century American women